Kirundo Airport  is an airstrip serving the city of Kirundo, Burundi.

See also

Transport in Burundi
List of airports in Burundi

References

External links
OpenStreetMap - Kirundo
SkyVector - Kirundo Airport

Kirundo Province